The San Diego Padres are an American professional baseball team based in San Diego. The Padres compete in Major League Baseball (MLB) as a member club of the National League (NL) West division. Founded in 1969, the club has won two NL pennants—in 1984 and 1998, losing in the World Series both years. As of 2022, they have had 16 winning seasons in franchise history. The Padres are one of two Major League Baseball teams (the other being the Los Angeles Angels) in California to originate from the state; the Athletics were originally from Philadelphia (and moved to the state from Kansas City), and the Dodgers and Giants are originally from two New York City boroughs—Brooklyn and Manhattan, respectively. As of 2022, the Padres are the only team in California not to have won a World Series. 

Following the relocation of the Chargers to Los Angeles in 2017, the Padres became the only franchise in the four major American professional sports leagues in the San Diego sports market.

From 1969 through 2022, the Padres have an overall record of 3,952–4,568.

Franchise history

Pacific Coast League

The Padres adopted their name from the Pacific Coast League team that arrived in San Diego in 1936. That minor league franchise won the PCL title in 1937, led by 18-year-old Ted Williams, the future Hall-of-Famer who was a native of San Diego.  The team's name, Spanish, Italian and Portuguese for "fathers", refers to the Spanish Franciscan friars who founded San Diego in 1769.

Major League Baseball

In 1969, the Padres joined the ranks of Major League Baseball as one of four new expansion teams, along with the Montreal Expos (now the Washington Nationals), the Kansas City Royals, and the Seattle Pilots (now the Milwaukee Brewers). One of its earliest owners was C. Arnholt Smith, a prominent San Diego businessman and former owner of the PCL Padres whose interests included banking, tuna fishing, hotels, real estate and an airline. Despite initial excitement, the guidance of longtime baseball executives, Eddie Leishman and Buzzie Bavasi, as well as a new playing field, the team struggled; the Padres finished in last place in each of its first six seasons in the NL West, losing 100 games or more four times. One of the few bright spots on the team during the early years was first baseman and slugger Nate Colbert, an expansion draftee from the Houston Astros and still the Padres' career leader in home runs.

The team's fortunes gradually improved as they won five National League West titles and reached the World Series twice, in 1984 and in 1998, but lost both times. The Padres' main draw during the 1980s and 1990s was hall of famer Tony Gwynn, who won eight league batting titles. They moved into their current stadium, Petco Park, in 2004.

On August 20, 2020, the Padres became the first team in MLB history to hit a grand slam in four consecutive games earning the nickname, "Slam Diego Padres".

Until 2021, the Padres were the last team in MLB that had yet to throw a no-hitter. The record was broken on April 9, 2021, as Joe Musgrove accomplished the feat against the Texas Rangers, finally ending the longest no-hit drought by a team in MLB history. On September 5, 1997, Andy Ashby took a no-hitter into the ninth inning, which was previously the closest that the team had come to achieving this feat.

Spring training
The team has played its spring training games at the Peoria Sports Complex in Peoria, Arizona since 1994. They share the stadium with the Seattle Mariners.

From 1969 to 1993, the Padres held spring training in Yuma, Arizona at Desert Sun Stadium. Due to the short driving distance and direct highway route (all on Interstate 8), Yuma was very popular with Padres fans, and many fans would travel by car from San Diego for spring training games. The move from Yuma to Peoria was very controversial, but was defended by the team as a reflection on the low quality of facilities in Yuma and the long travel necessary to play against other Arizona-based spring training teams (whose sites were all in the Phoenix and Tucson areas, both rather far from Yuma).

Logos and colors

Throughout the team's history, the San Diego Padres have used multiple logos, uniform, and color combinations.

1969–1979: Original brown & gold
Their first logo in 1969 depicted a friar swinging a bat with Padres written at the top while standing in a sun-like figure with San Diego Padres on the exterior of it. The "Swinging Friar" has popped up on the uniform on and off ever since. Although the "Swinging Friar" is no longer used as the primary logo, it remains as the mascot of the team and is now used as an alternate logo and on the uniform sleeve.

Brown and gold were the Padres' original colors. The team's first uniforms featured a cream base for the home uniforms and a tan base for the road uniforms. Brown letters with gold trim adorned the uniforms, which featured the team name in front of both designs. A second tan uniform, this time with the city name, was used as a road alternate before becoming the primary in 1971. Caps were all-brown with the gold "SD", though the team later broke out an alternate gold cap with a brown brim and "SD" lettering.

Switching from flannel to polyester in 1972, the Padres radically changed their uniforms. The team wore all-gold uniforms and pants regardless of road or home games, with the only difference being the road uniform emblazoned with the city name and the home uniform with the team name. The Padres also broke out a new brown cap, complete with a gold front panel and a brown "SD", which would remain for the next several years.  The gold front panel was shaped as a bell, alluding to the bells in the historic missions in California.

In 1974, the Padres returned to wearing traditional uniforms. The home design now had a script "Padres" lettering in front, with the road design keeping much of the original aesthetic. Chest numbers were also added. In 1976, the Padres ditched the buttons in favor of pullovers for their home uniform. In addition, they went with a brown uniform top for road games, featuring gold sleeves and gold letters.

The brown uniforms served as a template for the Padres' next uniform set beginning in 1978. The home uniforms now featured brown sleeves and gold letters, and a gold alternate with brown sleeves and letters was also released. The full team name, which was written in a more futuristic font, was emblazoned in front while the swinging friar logo was added to the left sleeve. However, this set only lasted for that season, as the Padres tweaked its design the next season. The updated design removed the swinging friar logo while returning to the team name/city name dynamic for home and road games respectively. The gold uniforms were also retired.

1980–1984: Brown, gold, & orange

In 1980, the Padres added orange to the palette. The team's next uniform set removed the contrasting colored sleeves and chest numbers, and orange was added to the letters and striping of the home uniforms and trim and striping of the road uniforms. The caps were also updated to feature orange trim on the "SD" and within the gold panel. In 1984, the Padres added the initials "RAK" on the left sleeve in honor of Ray Kroc, who had owned the team since 1974.

1985–1990: Brown & orange pinstripes
In 1985, the Padres switched to using a script-like logo in which Padres was written sloped up. That would later become a script logo for the Padres. The team's colors were changed to brown and orange and remained this way through the 1990 season. In 1989, the Padres took the scripted Padres logo and put it in a gray ring that read "San Diego Baseball Club" with a striped center.

That same year, the Padres returned to wearing traditional buttoned uniforms. The home uniforms featured the script "Padres" in front while the road uniforms had the "SD" emblazoned on the left chest. Brown letters with orange trim and brown pinstripes adorned both uniforms. The "RAK" initials remained until 1986. An all-brown cap with the orange "SD" was used with the uniform.

1991–2003: Blue & orange
In 1991, the Padres logo was updated. The color of the ring was changed to silver, and the Padres script was changed from brown to blue. The logo only lasted one year, as the Padres changed their logo for the third time in three years, again by switching colors of the ring. The logo became a white ring with fewer stripes in the center and a darker blue Padres script with orange shadows and they also wearing blue pin stripes. In 1991, the team's colors were also changed, to a combination of orange and navy blue.

The home uniform kept the pinstripes but was changed to navy blue, which was also implemented on the letters. The road uniforms eliminated the pinstripes and added the city name in navy blue block letters with white trim and orange drop shadows. A navy cap with the "S" in white and "D" in orange was used with the uniform. The team logo was added on the left sleeve in 1996.

The Padres unveiled a navy blue alternate uniform in 1997, featuring the team name in front written in navy blue with orange drop shadows. Other features included orange numbers at the back and white piping along the chest, neck and sleeves. White chest numbers were added in 1999. Initially, the swinging friar logo was added to the left sleeve, but was removed after the 1998 season in favor of the team's primary logo which lasted until the 2000 season.

The following year, the Padres began wearing an alternate home white uniform which bore the same features as the primary home uniform minus the pinstripes and orange trim. Navy blue piping was also added. An alternate navy cap with the white "SD" was used with the uniform. This uniform became the primary in 2001, after which the pinstriped uniforms were retired following that season.

2004–2015: Blue & sand
The logo was completely changed when the team changed stadiums between the 2003 and 2004 seasons, with the new logo looking similar to home plate with San Diego written in sand font at the top right corner and the Padres new script written completely across the center. Waves finished the bottom of the plate. Navy remained but a sandy beige replaced orange as a secondary color. The team's colors were also changed, to navy blue and sand brown. In 2009, the San Diego was removed from the top right corner of the logo.

For the next seven seasons the Padres were the only team in Major League Baseball that did not have a grey jersey. On the road, the team wore sand uniforms with the city name in front. The home design featured the updated "Padres" script in navy with sand drop shadows. Both uniforms featured the primary logo on the left sleeve. The alternate blue uniform featured the same "Padres" script in sand, and the swinging friar logo was added to the left sleeve. The Padres continued to wear their primary navy cap at home, while on the road they went with a second navy cap with "SD" in sand.

In 2011, the Padres' road uniform was changed to a grey base, and the navy and sand caps were used exclusively with the navy alternates. After the season, the alternate navy cap was retired.

For the 2012 season, the Padres unveiled a new primary logo, featuring the cap logo inside a navy blue circle with the words "San Diego Padres Baseball Club" adorning the outer circle. The "swinging friar" logo was recolored navy blue and white and was added to the left sleeve of the home uniform. Another secondary logo features the Padres script carried over from the previous year's primary logo below the depiction of Petco Park in sand and above the year of the team's first season (EST. 1969); this design was added to the team's road and navy alternates. While the home uniforms kept the sand trim, the road and navy alternates did not. In addition, the "SD" replaced "Padres" in front of the navy alternates, and the city name wordmark on the road uniforms was updated. All uniforms also added piping around the chest, neck and sleeves.

2016–2019: Blue & white
In the 2016 season, the Padres wore a navy blue and gold color scheme, similar to the one used on the 2016 All-Star Game logo. The home uniform was patterned similarly to the alternate navy uniforms, with gold trim accenting the piping and letters. An alternate navy cap with the "S" in white and "D" in gold was also used with the uniform. To coincide with the change, the Padres added a new brown and gold alternate uniform to be worn mostly during Friday home games, along with an updated gold-paneled brown cap.

For the 2017 season, the Padres revealed a new color scheme and new jerseys for the second straight year. The gold was scrapped from the home uniform and the team reverted to a navy blue-and-white combo. The word Padres returned to the front of the home uniform, but with a new script, while the script on the road uniform reverted to the San Diego wordmark style it used from 2004 to 2011. Both uniforms also added the "SD" logo on the left sleeve. The navy blue alternates remained intact minus the left sleeve patch. Despite this major change, the brown and gold alternate uniform from the previous set was retained, with the addition of the "SD" on the left sleeve.

2020–present: Brown & gold pinstripes

The club announced in January 2019 that the original brown and gold colors would return for the 2020 season. The new uniform designs featuring the brown and gold colors were officially unveiled on November 9. The team featured brown and gold on each of the three unveiled jerseys, including the return of pinstripes to the Padre home jersey for the first time since 2001 and a sand-colored road jersey (along with pinstripes, making the Padres the only team in Major League Baseball to wear road pinstripes) for the first time since 2010. Alternate non-pinstriped sand pants are paired with the brown alternate jersey. The shade of the sand color is noticeably darker than the sand-colored road jerseys worn from 2004 to 2010. An all-brown cap with "SD" in gold was also released.

City Connect
In 2022, the Padres joined 13 other teams in wearing Nike's "City Connect" uniforms. The primarily white uniform featured pink, mint green and yellow accents on the letters and sleeves, and has "San Diego" written in a graffiti style. The left mint sleeve contained a recolored version of the "swinging friar" logo in pink and yellow. The all-mint cap featured the pink interlocking "SD" in front. The uniform intended to pay tribute to the San Diego–Tijuana bi-national metropolitan area, highlighting San Diego's long-standing relations with Tijuana in Baja California, Mexico.

Military appreciation

In 1996, the Padres became the first national sports team to have an annual military appreciation event. In 2000, the Padres began wearing a camouflage jersey to honor the military. The jersey is now in its seventh iteration. Starting in 2008, the Padres began wearing camouflage jerseys for every Sunday home game. They also wear these uniforms on Memorial Day, Independence Day, and Labor Day. For 2011, the Padres changed the camouflage design to a more modern "digital" design, using the MARPAT design after receiving permission from then-Commandant James Conway, and dropped the green from the lettering and logo of the jersey. Green was replaced by a sand-olive color (also in the cap worn with the jersey). For 2016, to coincide with hosting the 2016 Major League Baseball All-Star Game, the Padres changed the camouflage jersey once again; this time to navy blue, however, this design was only worn for one season as for 2017, the Padres switched the camouflage jersey to Marine, which was used through 2019. For 2020, the Padres will begin using two different camouflage jersey colors: green and sand-olive, both with the current Padres wordmark. Since 1995 Marine Recruits from the nearby Marine Corps Recruit Depot often visit the games en masse during Military Appreciation Day, in uniform, often filling entire sections in the upper deck of Petco Park. When they are present, the team commemorates this with a special Fourth Inning Stretch featuring the Marine Hymn played by stadium organist Bobby Cressey. Through April 2005 over 60,000 marine recruits were hosted by the Padres. This is part of an extensive military outreach program, which also includes a series of Military Appreciation Night games, and game tapes mailed to deployed United States Navy ships of the Pacific Fleet for onboard viewing (a large portion of the Pacific Fleet is homeported in San Diego).. Now, every Sunday home game the Padres play is "Military Sunday", where they wear their camouflage uniforms instead of their normal brown-and-yellow uniforms.

The San Diego area is home to a number of military installations, including several Navy and Coast Guard bases centered on San Diego Bay, Marine Corps Air Station Miramar (former home of the "Top Gun" training program), and the Marine Corps training ground at Camp Pendleton. Civilians employed at those bases account for around 5% of the county's working population.

Mascot

The "Swinging Friar" is currently the mascot of the team. Some in the past have confused The Famous Chicken as the mascot of the Padres. Although he does make appearances occasionally at San Diego sporting events, he has never been the official mascot of any San Diego sports team.

Season records

Postseason history

Achievements

Award winners & league leaders

Team record (single-season & career)

Baseball Hall of Famers
The following elected members of the Baseball Hall of Fame played and/or managed for the Padres.

Ford C. Frick Award recipients (broadcasters)

Retired numbers

The Padres have retired six numbers. The numbers are commemorated in a display at Petco Park's entrance at Home Plate Plaza. Originally, the numbers were atop the batter's eye in center field, until they were relocated in 2016. The numbers were not ready for display in time for the park's opening in 2004, but they were unveiled midseason. Also beginning in 2016, the numbers are displayed in the Ring of Honor on the upper deck façade above the press box behind home plate.

In 1988 Steve Garvey was the first player to have his number retired by the Padres.  He played only five seasons with San Diego, but hit the game-winning two-run home run in the bottom of the ninth inning against the Chicago Cubs in Game 4 of the 1984 National League Championship Series (NLCS), tying the series before the Padres won the next day. He was named the NLCS Most Valuable Player, and San Diego advanced to their first World Series. In 2016, The San Diego Union-Tribune ranked Garvey's Game 4 homer as the No. 1 moment in San Diego sports history. However, he played 14 of his 19 seasons with the rival Los Angeles Dodgers, where he was also more productive, and the retirement of his number by San Diego has been heavily debated.

On April 15, 1997, exactly 50 years after Jackie Robinson broke the baseball color line, the No. 42 he wore with the Brooklyn Dodgers was retired throughout major league baseball. Later that year, Randy Jones's No. 35 was retired by the Padres. He was a two-time All-Star (1975, 1976) and the club's first Cy Young Award winner in 1976. On the day his number was retired, the Union-Tribune wrote that Jones was "the most popular athlete in the history of this city" during the mid-1970s. Dave Winfield was next to have his number, 31, retired in 2001, when he was also inducted into the Baseball Hall of Fame.  His retirement ceremony also celebrated his decision to be the first member of the Hall of Fame to have his plaque depicting him wearing a Padres cap. Winfield played for six teams in his 22-year career, spending his first eight seasons in San Diego. In 2004, the Padres retired No. 19 in honor of Gwynn, who is widely considered the greatest Padres player ever. He played his entire 20-year career with San Diego and won an NL-record eight batting titles. The most recent number to be retired was Trevor Hoffman's No. 51 in 2011. He had retired from playing after 2010, when he left the game as MLB's career leader in saves with 601, including 552 with the Padres.

Prior to moving to Petco, the team played at Qualcomm Stadium, where the retired numbers were originally displayed on banners hanging from the light towers above the left field stands. However, Garvey's number was commemorated instead on the wall behind the spot in right-center field where his winning home run in the 1984 NLCS cleared the fence, but the number disappeared when the stadium was expanded in 1997 and the location was masked by an overhang. It reappeared in 2002 when all the retired numbers were moved and inscribed on the outfield fence.

† Number retired by Major League Baseball

The Padres also have a "star on the wall" in honor of broadcaster Jerry Coleman, in reference to his trademark phrase "Oh Doctor! You can hang a star on that baby!"  Nearby the initials of the late owner Ray Kroc are also displayed.  Both the star and the initials are painted in gold on the front of the pressbox down the right-field line accompanied by the name of the person in white. Kroc was honored in 1984, Coleman in 2001.

Team Hall of Fame

The following 16 people have been inducted into the San Diego Padres Hall of Fame since it was founded in 1999.

San Diego Hall of Champions
Gwynn, Winfield, Fingers, Gossage, Randy Jones, and Graig Nettles (3B, 1984–1987) are members of the San Diego Hall of Champions, which is open to athletes native to the San Diego area (such as Nettles) as well as to those who played for San Diego teams (such as Gwynn).

Roster

Championships

The Padres are one of two teams in the National League West that have never won the World Series, though they have made and lost both appearances as the National League Pennant winner in both 1984 and 1998 respectively.

Minor league affiliates

The San Diego Padres farm system consists of six minor league affiliates.

Radio and television

Padres' games are currently televised by Bally Sports San Diego. Don Orsillo is the play-by-play announcer, with Mark Grant as color analyst and either Julie Alexandria, Ron Zinter, or Bob Scanlan as field reporter. Mike Pomeranz hosts the Padres Live pre- and post-game show along with Mark Sweeney.

As of the 2021 season, Padres radio broadcasts in English are carried by KWFN 97.3 The Fan, after having previously been carried by sister station 94.9 KBZT upon the acquisition of the radio rights by Entercom in 2017. Jesse Agler is the primary play-by-play announcer, with Tony Gwynn Jr. serving as color analyst. The games are also broadcast in Spanish on XEMO-AM, La Poderosa 860 AM, with Eduardo Ortega, Carlos Hernández and Pedro Gutiérrez announcing. Padre games were also aired from 2006 to 2010 on XHPRS-FM 105.7.

Spanish language telecasts of Sunday games are seen XHAS-TDT channel 33. Until September 2007, Friday and Saturday games were seen in Spanish on KBOP-CA channel 43, until that station changed to an all-infomercial format. This makes XHAS-TDT the only over-the-air-television station carrying Padres baseball. English-language Padres over-the-air broadcasts aired through the years on XETV-TV 6, KCST-TV 39, KUSI-TV 51, KFMB-TV 8 and KSWB-TV 69.

John Demott was the Padres' first public address announcer when the team began in 1969.  By the late 1970s, Bruce Binkowski had taken over as PA announcer, and became the longest-serving public address announcer in the team's history, remaining until the end of the 1999 season.  First DeMott and then Binkowski also were responsible with PA announcing duties for the San Diego Chargers and the San Diego State University Aztecs, both of which were joint tenants at Qualcomm Stadium with the Padres until the Padres moved into Petco Park.  From Petco Park's opening in 2004 until 2013, the PA announcer was Frank Anthony, a radio host with 105.7 XHPRS-FM. On April 19, 2014, Alex Miniak was announced as the new Public Address announcer for the San Diego Padres. Miniak was formerly the PA announcer for the New Hampshire Fisher Cats, the Double-A affiliate of the Toronto Blue Jays, and is the current PA commentator for the MLB The Show series.

The San Diego Padres were first portrayed in the 1979 NBC made-for-TV film The Kid from Left Field, starring Gary Coleman as Jackie Robinson "J.R." Cooper, a youngster who is passionate about baseball, and puts his knowledge to good use when he becomes the manager of the Padres and helps lead them to the World Series.

In 2016, the San Diego Padres were portrayed once again in the one-season Fox television series Pitch, starring Kylie Bunbury as Ginny Baker, the first female to play in Major League Baseball.

Educational involvement 
The San Diego Padres established The Padres Scholars program, the first of its kind among professional sports. Originally each Padres scholar was selected as a seventh-grader and received a $5,000 scholarship after graduation from high school to go towards higher education. This program has reached 389 students from its establishment in 1995 to now. Over the past few years the program has undergone a few changes to be effective from an education standpoint. This program focuses on creating a close relationship between the chosen scholars and the team.  As of 2011, 3 high school seniors will be chosen to receive a $30,000 scholarship to be awarded through the course of their higher education. Maintaining this prestigious award is conditional on maintaining contact with the Padres and providing proof of good academic standing.

The San Diego Padres are the sponsors of and heavily involved in most aspects of the Sports Business Management MBA degree program offered in conjunction with San Diego State University's College of Business Administration. SDSU's Sports MBA is the only program of its kind created in partnership with a professional sports franchise. The curriculum focuses on the entire sports business industry, not just baseball. The program includes an internship. Members of Padres senior management regularly participate, including work with the development and continued coordination of SDSU's International Case Competition, which annually attracts participation from top business schools.

See also
 An American Journey: My Life on the Field, In the Air, and On the Air – Jerry Coleman's 2008 autobiography

Notes

References

Further reading

External links

 
 San Diego Padres Logos

 
Major League Baseball teams
Cactus League
1969 establishments in California
Baseball teams established in 1969